The 1893–94 season was the second season in Liverpool F.C.'s existence, and was their first year in The Football League, in which they competed in the Second Division. The season covers  the period from 1 July 1893 to 30 June 1894.

The club's first match in the Football League was against Middlesbrough Ironopolis on 2 September 1893. Liverpool won 2–0, Malcolm McVean scoring their first goal in league football.
Their first season in the Football League was a success. Liverpool finished the season unbeaten in 28 matches, 22 of which they won. Their success meant they finished top of the Second Division, but as there was no automatic promotion to the First Division, they were entered into the 'Test Match system'.

Test Match 1894
The Test Match was between Liverpool and the bottom team in the First Division. They beat Newton Heath to move up to the First Division.

Players

One of the players, James Henderson from Scotland, was born in 1870 and played one match as a striker for Liverpool, after he was signed from a Scottish club named Annbank.

References

External links
LFC History Season 1892-93
1893–94 Liverpool F.C.Results
LFC Kit 1893-94

1893-1894
English football clubs 1893–94 season